Mustard is a dull/dark yellow color that resembles culinary mustard. It is similar to the color Flax.

The first recorded use of mustard as a color name in English was in 1886.

In culture
 The board game Cluedo has a mustard-colored pawn representing the character Colonel Mustard.
 A mustard-colored belt is awarded to the winner of the Nathan's Hot Dog Eating Contest at Nathan's Famous in Coney Island, New York.
 In the bandana code of the gay leather subculture, wearing a mustard-colored bandana means that one is a size queen. However, the color  called "mustard" in the bandana code is lighter than the mustard color shown above.

See also 
List of colors

References 

Shades of yellow